This is a list of the National Register of Historic Places listings in Lincoln County, New Mexico.

This is intended to be a complete list of the properties and districts on the National Register of Historic Places in Lincoln County, New Mexico, United States.  Latitude and longitude coordinates are provided for many National Register properties and districts; these locations may be seen together in a map.

There are 34 properties and districts listed on the National Register in the county, including 1 National Historic Landmark. All of the places within the county on the National Register are also listed on the State Register of Cultural Properties with the single exception of the Lincoln Historic District although the landmark includes one contributing property recorded on the state register. NRHP properties within the county include two of the state's eight officially designated state historic sites.

Current listings

|}

See also

 List of National Historic Landmarks in New Mexico
 National Register of Historic Places listings in New Mexico

References

Lincoln
National Register of Historic Places in Lincoln County, New Mexico